The Opuha River is in Canterbury, New Zealand. A tributary of the Opihi River, its two branches flow southeast for  before joining the larger river between Geraldine and Fairlie.

Heavy rainfall caused the collapse of the Opuha Dam during its construction on the river in 1997.

Rivers of Canterbury, New Zealand
Rivers of New Zealand